Havern is a surname. Notable people with the surname include:

Dave Havern, American football player and coach
Gianluca Havern (born 1988), English footballer
Robert Havern III (1949–2014), American politician

See also
Haver